Sáblík (feminine Sáblíková) may refer to:

Lukas Sablik (born 1976), Czech professional ice hockey goaltender 
Martina Sáblíková (born 1987), Czech speed skater
Milan Sáblík (born 1991), Czech speed skater, younger brother of above

Czech-language surnames